Paul A. Brodeur (born April 24, 1964) is the mayor of Melrose, Massachusetts. Previously, he was a state legislator in the Massachusetts House of Representatives, representing the 32nd Middlesex district.

References

Mayors of Melrose, Massachusetts
Democratic Party members of the Massachusetts House of Representatives
1964 births
Living people